Victor Larchandet (29 December 1863 – 8 November 1936) was a French rugby union player. He competed at the 1900 Summer Olympics and won gold as part of the French team in what was the first rugby union competition at an Olympic Games.

References

External links

 
 Victor Larchandet's profile at Geneanet

1863 births
1936 deaths
Olympic rugby union players of France
French rugby union players
Olympic gold medalists for France
Rugby union players at the 1900 Summer Olympics
Medalists at the 1900 Summer Olympics
People from Jura (department)